Callogaza frederici is a species of sea snail, a marine gastropod mollusk in the family Margaritidae.

Distribution
This marine species occurs off South India and Sri Lanka.

References

 Smith, E.A. (1906) Natural history notes from R.I.M.S. ‘Investigator” – series III, No. 10. On the Mollusca from the Bay of Bengal and the Arabian Sea. Annals and Magazine of Natural History (seventh series), 18, 215–264

External links
 To World Register of Marine Species

frederici
Gastropods described in 1906